Carlo Grande (born 10 February 1957) is an Italian writer, screenwriter and journalist.
He works for several newspapers including La Stampa and La Repubblica. and has written several novels.

Selected bibliography 
 I cattivi elementi (2000)
 La via dei lupi (2006)

References 

1957 births
Living people
21st-century Italian novelists
Place of birth missing (living people)
Italian journalists
Italian male journalists